Beloved Impostor (German: Geliebte Hochstaplerin) is a 1961 German comedy film directed by Ákos Ráthonyi and starring Nadja Tiller, Walter Giller, Elke Sommer and Dietmar Schönherr. It is based on a play by Jacques Deval.

The film's sets were designed by the art directors Albrecht Becker and Herbert Kirchhoff. It was shot at the Wandsbek Studios in Hamburg with location shooting aboard the ocean liner SS Hanseatic.

Cast
Nadja Tiller as Martine Colombe
Walter Giller as Robert Bolle
Elke Sommer as Barbara Shadwell
Dietmar Schönherr as David Ogden
Loni Heuser as Mrs. Ogden
Ljuba Welitsch as Celia Shadwell
Rainer Penkert as Ship paymaster
Frank Freytag as Mr. Stanford
Stanislav Ledinek as Adam, bodyguard 
Manfred Steffen as Bernhard, bodyguard
Kurt Zips as Caesar, bodyguard
Edith Hancke as stewardess 
Hans Richter as Steward Pfister 
Kurt A. Jung as first steward 
Gert Segatz as second steward

References

External links

1960s crime comedy films
1960s German-language films
German crime comedy films
West German films
Films set on ships
Films about con artists
German films based on plays
Films based on works by Jacques Deval
Real Film films
1961 comedy films
Films directed by Ákos Ráthonyi
Films shot at Wandsbek Studios
1960s German films